Vadugapalayam is a village in the Ariyalur Taluk of Ariyalur district, Tamil Nadu, India. The city was part of Perambalur district until 2008 when it became part of the newly formed Ariyalur district.

Demographics 

 census, Vadugapalayam had a total population of 1884 with 969 males and 915 females.

References 

Villages in Ariyalur district